Diguvametta is a village in Prakasam district, Andhra Pradesh, India. It is located in the Nallamala Hills and is surrounded by forests on almost all sides. It had a population of 5166 at the time of the 2001 Census.

Geography 
Its altitude coupled with its location give it a somewhat cooler climate than the rest of the district. It has ample water reserves in the form of reservoirs and ponds and was used as a watering stop for trains earlier.

Demographics
The population is 5166. A significant chunk of the population belongs to the Chenchu tribe that inhabit the Nallamala Ranges.

References

Villages in Prakasam district